Edward,  Ed, Ned, or Ted Murphy may refer to:

Military
Edward F. Murphy (died 1908), U.S. Army corporal, Medal of Honor recipient for actions during the Indian Wars in 1879
Edward Murphy (Medal of Honor) (died 1924), U.S. Army private, Medal of Honor recipient for actions during the Indian Wars in 1869
Edward R. Murphy (naval officer) (born 1937), U.S. Navy officer, executive officer of the USS Pueblo

Politics and law
Edward Murphy (politician) (1818–1895), Canadian senator
Edward Murphy Jr. (1836–1911), U.S. senator from New York, and mayor of Troy, New York
Edward Sullivan Murphy (1880–1945), Northern Irish politician
Edward Preston Murphy (1904–1958), U.S. federal judge

Sports
Ned Murphy (fl. 1880s), Irish sportsman
Ed Murphy (pitcher) (1877–1935), American baseball player for the Philadelphia Phillies
Ed Murphy (first baseman) (1918–1991), American baseball player for the Philadelphia Phillies
Edward Murphy (cricketer) (1921–2020), English cricketer
Ed Murphy (soccer) (1930–2005), Scottish-born soccer player, played for the U.S. national team, 1955–1969
Ed Murphy (basketball, born 1941), American college basketball coach
Ted Murphy (Australian footballer) (born 1947), Australian rules footballer
Ed Murphy (basketball, born 1956), American basketball player
Edward Murphy (rower) (born 1971), American rower
Ed Murphy (rugby league) (born 1992), Australian rugby league player

Others
Edward Murphy (bishop) (1651–1728), Irish Roman Catholic Archbishop of Dublin
Edward Henry Murphy (c.1796–1847), Irish painter
Edward A. Murphy Jr. (1918–1990), American aerospace engineer, namesake of "Murphy's Law"
Edward A. Murphy (chemist) (fl. 1920s–1930s), Dunlop researcher credited with the invention of latex foam
Ed Murphy (activist) (born 1945), American activist
Edward H. Murphy (fl. 1970s–2000s), American businessman, executive of the American Petroleum Institute

See also
Edward Murphy Markham (1877–1950), U.S. Army general
Eddie Murphy (disambiguation)
Edward Murray (disambiguation)